Japi is a municipality in the state of Rio Grande do Norte in Brazil. The population is 4,995 (2020 est.) in an area of 189 km². It is located in the micro region Borborema Potiguar.

References

Municipalities in Rio Grande do Norte